The Templars of Honor and Temperance established in the United States in 1845 as the Marshall Temperance Fraternity as part of the temperance movement. The Templars were formed as a result of a schism within the older Sons of Temperance, when some felt that the organization did not have an elaborated enough ritual. The new group changed its name several times, first to "Marshall Temple, No. 1, Sons of Honor", then to "Marshall Temple of Honor, No. 1, Sons of Temperance". In 1846, the National Temple of the Templars of Honor and Temperance of the United States was instituted in New York.

The society had a secret ritual which was based on the medieval Knights Templar, the story of Damon and Pythias as well as Jonathan and David. The ritual worked six degrees and is said to have shown Masonic influence. The group was led by a "Supreme Council" and subordinate groups included "Grand Councils" and "Great Temples".

It is a secret fraternal order whose signs, hand grips, passwords and emblems closely resemble those of the Masons and the Odd Fellows.

The organization does still exist in Scandinavia, where it is known as Tempel Riddare Orden ("The Order of the Knight Templars").

References

External links 
Tempel Riddare Orden
Tempel Riddare Orden i Sverige
Templars of Honor and Temperance

Organizations established in 1845
Temperance organizations
Temperance organizations in the United States